Ernest Henry Wright (November 6, 1939 – March 20, 2007) was an American professional football player who was an offensive tackle for 13 seasons, from 1960 to 1969 in the American Football League (AFL), and from 1970 to 1972 in the National Football League (NFL).

Early life
Wright was born on November 6, 1939 in Toledo, Ohio and attended Scott High School. He played football for Ohio State University and started on the Buckeyes' offensive line in 1958 and 1959.

NFL career
Wright was an original member of the Los Angeles Chargers in 1960. He was drafted in the 15th round (200th overall) of the 1961 NFL Draft by the Los Angeles Rams, but he remained with the Chargers.

Wright was a starter for the Chargers in their 51-10 victory over the Boston Patriots in the 1963 AFL Championship game.

He was an AFL All-Star in 1961, 1963 and 1965. Chargers Hall of Fame coach Sid Gillman called the tandem of Wright and Hall-of-Famer Ron Mix "The best pair of offensive tackles in pro football''."

He played eight seasons for the Chargers, through the 1967 season. He played the next four seasons with the Cincinnati Bengals, including in their inaugural season of 1968. In 1968 and 1969, the Bengals were in the AFL; in 1970, they moved to the NFL as the two leagues merged. He returned to the Chargers to finish his career in 1972.

Wright was one of only 20 men who played all 10 years of the AFL's existence.

Personal life
In 1994, Wright founded The Pro Kids Golf Academy and Learning Center, a nonprofit organization for inner-city youth in San Diego. Wright was the first winner of the Ernie H. Wright Humanitarian Award, which the San Diego Hall of Champions had established in his honor. The award was presented to Wright during the hall's awards banquet in 2007.

He became a sports talent agent and later became the western regional chief for the NFL Players Association. He later operated a series of installations for people convicted of misdemeanors.

Wright died of cancer in 2007.

See also
 List of American Football League players

References

1939 births
2007 deaths
American football offensive tackles
Cincinnati Bengals players
Los Angeles Chargers players
Ohio State Buckeyes football players
San Diego Chargers players
American Football League All-Star players
Sportspeople from Toledo, Ohio
Players of American football from Ohio
Deaths from cancer in California
American Football League players